Kara Clark is an electrical engineer working at General Electric in Scotia, New York.

Clark was named a Fellow of the Institute of Electrical and Electronics Engineers (IEEE) in 2012 for her contributions to modeling of wind power generation''.

References

Fellow Members of the IEEE
Living people
Year of birth missing (living people)
Place of birth missing (living people)
General Electric employees
American electrical engineers